24 Mani Neram (read as "Irupatthi Naalu Mani Neram") is a 1984 Indian Tamil-language thriller film written and directed by Manivannan, starring Mohan, Sathyaraj, Nalini, and Jaishankar. The music was composed by Ilaiyaraaja with editing by B. Kandasamy and cinematography by A. Sabapathi. The film released on 18 July 1984 and is considered by critics as one of the best thriller films of Tamil cinema. The film was commercially successful and ran for 27 weeks. The film was remade in Kannada as Jayabheri (1989).

Plot 

X. W. Ramarathinam is a billionaire womaniser who rapes and kills the girls he likes. One day, he sees Janaki with her husband Raj on their wedding day in his own grand hotel. He initially indirectly tries to pursue Janaki to be his concubine. She complains to her husband who is a reporter. Ramarathinam learns of this and rapes and kills Janaki. He also frames Raj for this. Raj swears to kill Ramarathinam within 24 hours. When Ramarathinam kills his own PA, Swapna's brother, who is his henchmen for not finishing off Mohan. She swears revenge. But somehow, Ramarathinam discovers this. Instead of killing her first, he first rapes her and then kills her. Finally, Raj kills Ramarathinam within 24 hours as revenge.

Cast 
Mohan as Raj
Sathyaraj as Ramarathinam
Nalini as Janaki
Jaishankar as Vijay
Vadivukkarasi as  Lakshmi, Raj's mother
Swapna as Swapna
Ilavarasi as Rekha
Chinni Jayanth as Seenu
Senthil as Sidekick
Jyothi Lakshmi in a special appearance
Jayamalini in a special appearance
Anuradha in a special appearance
Bayilvan Ranganathan as Marutha Muthu

Production 
Manivannan retained the three lead actors of his Nooravathu Naal – Mohan, Sathyaraj and Nalini – for this film.

Soundtrack 
Lyrics were written by Pulamaipithan and composed by Ilaiyaraaja.

Release and reception 
24 Mani Neram was released on 20 July 1984. Jayamanmadhan of Kalki said the story was old fashioned, but praised the manner in which it was told. The film was a success, and is considered among the most significant projects for Mohan, Sathyaraj and Nalini.

References

External links 
 
 

1980s Tamil-language films
1984 thriller films
1984 films
Films directed by Manivannan
Films scored by Ilaiyaraaja
Indian thriller films